Marcel Cellier (29 October 1925 – 13 December 2013) was a Swiss organist, ethnomusicologist and music producer, internationally known for introducing the singing of Le Mystère des Voix Bulgares, and the playing of Gheorghe Zamfir. 

Cellier was the founder of the "Disques Cellier" recording label. From 1960, and for the next 25 years, he hosted a weekly radio show on "Radio Suisse Romande", which he called "From the Black Sea to the Baltic". 

In the 1960s, Cellier extensively researched Romanian folk music, which led to his discovery of Gheorghe Zamfir.  In 1984, he was presented with the "Grand prix audiovisuel de l'Europe" from the Académie du disque français in Paris. In 1989, he was presented with a Grammy Award for producing Le Mystère des Voix Bulgares, Vol. II which featured, among others, the Bulgarian State Television Female Vocal Choir.

In 2012, a documentary called Balkan Melodie was made about his travels in Eastern Europe.

Discography 
 Gheorghe Zamfir (1969) LP: Arion France 30 T 073
 La Doina Roumaine (1969) LP/CD: DC 001
 Flûte de Pan et Orgue – Gheorghe Zamfir/Marcel Cellier vol.1 (1970) LP/CD: DC 002
 Flûte de Pan et Orgue – Gheorghe Zamfir/Marcel Cellier vol 2 (1971) LP/CD: DC 003
 Les Virtuoses Roumains vol.1 (1972) LP: DC 004
 Flûte de Pan et Orgue – Gheorghe Zamfir/Marcel Cellier vol.3 (1972) LP/CD: DC 005
 Le Concert des Virtuoses Roumains (1975) LP/CD: DC 006
 Taragot et Orgue – Dumitru Farcas/Marcel Cellier vol. 1 (1975) LP/CD: DC 007
 Le Mystère des Voix Bulgares vol.1 (1975) LP/CD: DC 008
 Appenzeller Zäuerli (Jodel d'Appenzell) (1976) LP/CD: DC 009
 L'Albanie mystérieuse (1976) LP/CD: DC 010
 Le Clarino virtuose de la Grèce (1976) LP: DC 011
 Les Muverans (orchestre champêtre de Suisse Romande) (1976) LP: DC 012
 Taragot et Orgue – Dumitru Farcas/Marcel Cellier LP/CD: DC 014
 Flûte de Pan et Orgue – Gheorghe Zamfir/Marcel Cellier (1977) LP/CD: DC 015
 Flûte de Pan et Orgue (Panflöte Und Orgel) – Horea Crishan/Marcel Cellier (1979) LP: DC INT147.601
 Le Mystère des Voix Bulgares vol. 2 (1987) LP/CD: DC 016
 Le Mystère des Voix Bulgares vol. 3 (1989) LP/CD: DC 017
 To Rumania with love – Ulrich Herkenhoff/Marcel Cellier (1991) CD: DC 018
 Flûte de Pan, Cymbalum et Orgue – Simeon Stanciu/Ion Miu/Marcel et Alexandre Cellier (1991)CD: DC 019
 Marcel Cellier présente La Hongrie d'autrefois (Yesterday's Hungary) (1995) CD: Verany
 Voyage au bout des notes – Alexandre Cellier/Jean Duperrex (1996) CD: DC 020
 Le Mystère des Voix Bulgares vol. 4 (1997) CD: DC 021
 Instruments et Rythmes Bulgares (1999) CD: DC 022
 De la Mer Noire à la Baltique (30 ans d'émissions de radio) (1999) 2CD: DO
 Concert pour les 80 ans de Marcel Cellier (Cully) DVD: DC 023

References

External links 
Balkan Melodie (2012)
Who is Marcel Cellier and Gheorghe Zamfir?

1925 births
2013 deaths
Swiss organists
Swiss male musicians
Music historians
Swiss musicologists
Grammy Award winners